Yabe Siad Isman (born 12 March 1998) is a Djiboutian footballer who plays as a defender for Djiboutian club Arta/Solar7 and the Djibouti national team.

International goals

References

External links
 
 

1998 births
Living people
Association football defenders
Djiboutian footballers
Djibouti international footballers
Djibouti Premier League players
AS Arta/Solar7 players